Thomas Alderson (1909–1962) was a footballer who played in the Football League for Chester, Darlington, Leeds United, Luton Town.

References

English footballers
West Auckland Town F.C. players
Bradford City A.F.C. players
Cockfield F.C. players
Chester City F.C. players
Huddersfield Town A.F.C. players
Darlington F.C. players
Leeds United F.C. players
Luton Town F.C. players
English Football League players
1909 births
1962 deaths
Association football inside forwards
People from West Auckland
Footballers from County Durham